"Visions of Paradise" is a single by English singer-songwriter Mick Jagger, the opening track and single from his fourth solo album, Goddess in the Doorway. Released as a single on 12 March 2002, it reached No. 43 in the UK charts.

Chart performance

References 

2002 singles
Mick Jagger songs
Songs written by Mick Jagger
2001 songs
Songs written by Rob Thomas (musician)